Lake Yonah is a lake on the Tugaloo River, separating Georgia and South Carolina.

The lake is created by the Yonah Dam, which is owned and operated by Georgia Power, and generates 22 megawatts. Lake Yonah is a residential lake with 72 vacation and permanent homes. After the Tugaloo River flows from Yonah through the lower dam, it continues to Lake Hartwell, and joins the Savannah River, which empties into the Atlantic Ocean. Another tributary to this river is the Seneca River, which flows into it from South Carolina.

See also
List of lakes in South Carolina

References

Protected areas of Habersham County, Georgia
Protected areas of Oconee County, South Carolina
Yonah
Yonah
Protected areas of Stephens County, Georgia
Yonah
Georgia Power dams
Bodies of water of Stephens County, Georgia
Bodies of water of Habersham County, Georgia
Bodies of water of Oconee County, South Carolina